Julien Le Bas (9 June 1924 – 25 November 2021) was a French sprinter who competed in the 1948 Summer Olympics. He died on 25 November 2021, at the age of 97.

Competition record

References

1924 births
2021 deaths
Athletes (track and field) at the 1948 Summer Olympics
French male sprinters
Olympic athletes of France
People from Saint-Lô
Sportspeople from Manche